Uchimura is a Japanese surname. Notable people with the surname include:

Uchimura Kanzō (1861–1930), Japanese author and Christian evangelist
Kensuke Uchimura (born 1986), Japanese baseball player 
Kōhei Uchimura (born 1989), Japanese artistic gymnast
Chigusa Ikeda (born 1976, also known as Miruku Uchimura), Japanese voice actress 
Teruyoshi Uchimura (born 1964), Japanese comedian 

Japanese-language surnames